Gruta Canabrava (BA-0261) is a limestone cave measuring  long, located near the municipality of Santana, in the State of Bahia, Brazil.

See also
List of caves in Brazil

References

External links
 Base de Dados do Ministerio do Meio Hambiente Governo Federal - ICMBIO Official Website

Caves of Bahia
Wild caves